Elistvere Animal Park is a zoological park in Tartu County, Estonia. It specialises in the native fauna of Estonia and is operated by the State Forest Management Centre.

The park was founded in 1997 and aims to display animals and birds in as natural conditions as possible. It also aims to provide educational facilities and activities, and create a sanctuary for animals that have been injured or orphaned.

In 2020 the park recorded 79,000 visitors, a record despite the year's coronavirus pandemic.

References

External links 
 Official website

Zoos in Estonia
Tourist attractions in Tartu County